The 2008 Iowa Senate election were held on November 4, 2008.  The Senate seats for the twenty-five even-numbered districts were up for election.  Senate terms are staggered such that half the membership is elected every two years, with each Senators serving a four-year term.  Prior to the election, the Democrats were in the majority - marking the first time in 42 years that the Democrats had controlled both branches of the Iowa General Assembly and the Governor's Office.  They expanded this majority by two seats in the 2008 elections.

Senate composition

Results
The election took place on November 4, 2008.  Candidate list and official results from the Iowa Secretary of State.

General election

See also
United States House of Representatives elections in Iowa, 2008
Iowa Senate
Iowa House of Representatives
Iowa House of Representatives elections, 2008
Iowa General Assembly
Political party strength in U.S. states

References

Senate
2008 Senate
Iowa Senate